Stalker is a 2012 Irish psychological thriller film written and directed by Mark O'Connor.

Plot
Oliver Nolan, a volatile homeless man, wanders the streets of Dublin City during the Christmas period. After an unusual encounter with an evangelist, Oliver believes he is sent on a mission from God to clean up society. When he saves a disaffected young boy named Tommy from some local bullies an unlikely friendship is formed. Oliver soon learns that Tommy’s mother is an addict and his uncle Rudyard is a local drug dealer, and takes it upon himself to get even with Rudyard and his gang of petty criminals for taking advantage of his only friend, Tommy.

Cast
 John Connors as Oliver
 Barry Keoghan as Tommy
 Peter Coonan as Rudyard

Production
Stalker is Ireland's first crowd funded feature film. The film was shot on location in Dublin and Wicklow on Canon 5D Mark 2.

Release
The film premiered at the Galway Film Fleadh on 13 July 2012.

Reception
Despite the film's microbudget it has received positive critical response. The Irish Times called Mark O'Connor "a young wizard of cut-price film-making" and described the film as a "violent, picaresque trawl through contemporary Dublin discontents." The film received 'Runner Up' in the Best Irish Feature Film category at Galway Film Fleadh 2012.

References

External links
 
 

2012 films
Irish drama films
Irish crime films
2010s English-language films